Wendy B. Libby, a native of Brooklyn, New York, is an American college administrator. She attended Cornell University and received a Bachelor's (Biology) in 1972, an MBA from Cornell's Johnson Graduate School of Management in 1977. She earned her doctorate in Educational Administration from the University of Connecticut in 1994. She was president of Stephens College in Columbia, Missouri, the second oldest women's institute in America, from 2003 to 2009. She was named the ninth president of Stetson University in July 2009.

References

Year of birth missing (living people)
Living people
Heads of universities and colleges in the United States
Stephens College faculty
Stetson University faculty
Samuel Curtis Johnson Graduate School of Management alumni
University of Connecticut alumni
People from Brooklyn